{{DISPLAYTITLE:C9H15NO2}}
The molecular formula C9H15NO2 (molar mass: 169.22 g/mol) may refer to:

 Aceclidine, a parasympathomimetic miotic agent used in the treatment of narrow angle glaucoma
 Piperidione, a sedative drug